Gold dust is fine particles of gold.

Gold dust may also refer to:

Animal
Gold Dust (elephant) (1873–1898), male Asian elephant that was kept in the National Zoo in the late 19th century
Gold dust day gecko, a subspecies of geckos which lives in northern Madagascar and on the Comoros
Gold dust disease, also known as velvet disease, a fish disease caused by the dinoflagellate parasites

Plant
Aurinia saxatilis, an ornamental plant native to Asia and Europe
Aucuba japonica, the gold dust plant, an ornamental shrub native to China, Korea, and Japan
Chrysothrix candelaris, the gold dust lichen, a yellow fungus that commonly grows on tree bark
Gold Dust, a cultivar of the rosemary plant

Music

Record labels and production companies 
Gold Dust Media, a record label which joined Studio !K7 in 2008
Gold Dust Records, a record label formed by Goldie Lookin Chain
Goldust Productions, a music production company

Albums 
Gold Dust (Tori Amos album), a 2012 studio album by Tori Amos
Gold Dust (Sandy Denny album), a 1998 live album by Sandy Denny
Gold Dust (Jonathan Jeremiah album), 2012 album by Jonathan Jeremiah with The Metropole Orkest
Gold Dust (The Dirty Youth album), a 2015 studio album by The Dirty Youth

Songs 
"Gold Dust" (DJ Fresh song), a 2008/2010 song by DJ Fresh
"Gold Dust" (Galantis Song), a 2016 song from Swedish DJ duo, Galantis from their debut album Pharmacy
"Gold Dust" (Sandi Thom song) a 2010 song from Scottish singer, Sandi Thom from her album Merchants and Thieves
"Gold Dust", a 2013 song by John Newman from Tribute
"Golddust", a 2016 song by Danny Brown from Atrocity Exhibition

People
Goldust (Dustin Runnels, born 1969), American wrestler also known as Dustin Rhodes
Gold Dust Trio, a group of promoters who controlled the world of professional wrestling during the 1920s
Gold Dust Twins, Goldie and Dustie, the mascots of Fairbank's Gold Dust washing powder

Other
Gold Dust (magazine), a UK literary biannual
Golddust, Tennessee
Gold Dust washing powder, early all-purpose cleaning product

See also